Elaphe carinata, the king ratsnake (also known as Taiwan stink snake),  is a species of Colubrid snake found in Southeast and East Asia.

Description
The other common names "stink snake" or "stinking goddess" refer to this species' highly developed post-anal glands which, when the snake is picked up, are frequently emptied, with a very strong, bad odour.

Elaphe carinata is an active, predatory snake that eats everything from beetles to birds to snakes, with particular preference for the latter.

The common name of "king ratsnake" refers to its habit of eating other snakes, including venomous species such as the Chinese cobra and the sharp-nosed viper. It suffocates its prey by constriction, similar to the hunting technique of boas and pythons. It also preys on rodents and other small animals.

There is some concern among herpetoculturists that the king ratsnake may actually be more closely related to the kingsnakes of the genus Lampropeltis than to its current taxonomic family of the ratsnakes (Elaphe).  This is due in part to the dietary habits of the king ratsnake, in particular its preference for ectothermic prey such as snakes and lizards, and to the physical structure of the head, which is far less distinct than that of most rat snakes and closely resembles the elongated head and indistinct neck structure of the kingsnakes. In actuality, there is very little direct genetic relationship between the two genera. They share much more in common genetically with other Eurasian rat snakes such as the Russian rat snake (Elaphe schrenkii) and the Japanese rat snake (Elaphe climacophora). They may also share a common lineage with the genera Coelognathus, Gonyosoma and Orthriophis. External morphological characteristics and behavior alone are generally not considered reliable taxonomic keys to classifying relationships between species, as the majority of current classification is based on DNA evidence. The superficial resemblance to American kingsnakes is more likely an example of convergent evolution, much like the similarities between the South American emerald tree boa (Corallus caninus) and the Indo-Australian green tree python (Morelia viridis).

The king rat snake is also uncommonly found in the exotic pet trade.

Distribution: China, northern Vietnam, Taiwan, Japan (Ryukyu Islands).

Use
Elaphe carinata is one of major species in snake trade in China, particularly in skin trade but also of live animals; it is the most commonly available snake in restaurants.

References

External links

 

Elaphe
Snakes of Asia
Snakes of China
Reptiles of Japan
Reptiles of Taiwan
Snakes of Vietnam
Reptiles described in 1864
Taxa named by Albert Günther